Bandhavgarh Assembly constituency is one of the 230 constituencies of Madhya Pradesh Legislative Assembly. It is a segment of Shahdol Lok Sabha constituency.

Members of Legislative Assembly

^ bypoll

See also

 Bandhavgarh
 Umaria district
 Shahdol (Lok Sabha constituency)

References

Umaria district
Assembly constituencies of Madhya Pradesh